Swat the Fly is a 1935 Fleischer Studios animated short film directed by Dave Fleischer and starring Betty Boop and Pudgy the Puppy.

Synopsis
While Betty tries to bake a cake, an annoying fly flies in to pester Betty and Pudgy the Pup. Betty, after failed attempts at regularly swatting a fly, desperately begins tossing gobs of extra dough at the little fly, but the fly keeps escaping. In the end, Betty catches the fly in a lump of dough, flat on Pudgy's nose, but the entire house is in shambles. Then the fly manages to free itself once more.

References

External links
 Swat the Fly at the Big Cartoon Database.
 Swat the Fly on YouTube.
 

1935 films
Animated films about insects
Betty Boop cartoons
1930s American animated films
American black-and-white films
1935 animated films
Paramount Pictures short films
Fleischer Studios short films
Short films directed by Dave Fleischer
Films about flies